Karl Cooper Rubin (born January 27, 1956) is an American mathematician at  University of California, Irvine as Thorp Professor of Mathematics. Between 1997 and 2006, he was a professor at Stanford, and before that worked at Ohio State University between 1987 and 1999. His research interest is in elliptic curves. He was the first mathematician (1986) to show that some elliptic curves over the rationals have finite Tate–Shafarevich groups. It is widely believed that these groups are always finite.

Education and career
Rubin graduated from Princeton University in 1976, and obtained his Ph.D. from Harvard in 1981. His thesis advisor was Andrew Wiles. He was a Putnam Fellow in 1974, and a Sloan Research Fellow in 1985.

In 1988, Rubin received a National Science Foundation Presidential Young Investigator award, and in 1992 won the American Mathematical Society Cole Prize in number theory. In 2012 he became a fellow of the American Mathematical Society.  Rubin's parents were mathematician Robert Joshua Rubin and astronomer Vera Rubin. Rubin is brother to astronomer and physicist Judith Young.

See also
CEILIDH
Torus-based cryptography
Euler system
Stark conjectures

References

External links
 Karl Cooper Rubin at the Mathematics Genealogy Project
 Karl Rubin's Home page

Institute for Advanced Study visiting scholars
University of California, Irvine faculty
Ohio State University faculty
Columbia University faculty
1956 births
Living people
20th-century American mathematicians
21st-century American mathematicians
Princeton University alumni
Harvard University alumni
Number theorists
Putnam Fellows
Fellows of the American Mathematical Society